Romanian philosophy is a name covering either:

a) the philosophy done in Romania or by Romanians, or

b) an ethnic philosophy, which expresses at a high level the fundamental features of the Romanian spirituality, or which elevates to a philosophical level the Weltanschauung of the Romanian people, as deposited in language and folklore, traditions, architecture and other linguistic and cultural artifacts.

The specificity of the Romanian philosophy 
The discussion concerning the existence of a Romanian philosophy has known three stages.

Between the two World Wars, after the emergence of Greater Romania, Romanian national identity went through a crisis. Since it was not centered anymore on immediate political goals (national rights, independence, national unity etc.), the idea now had a more pronounced cultural character. Therefore, discussions of "national specificity" in historiography, literature and philosophy became very common. The first history of Romanian philosophy was published in 1922 by Marin Ștefănescu, proving that philosophical thinking in Romania had reached the level of self-reflexivity; in other words, it had become conscious of itself. The general conclusion of interbellum discussions, which involved almost every notable philosopher, was that there is a Romanian philosophy proper, with a distinct profile among other national philosophies.  Constantin Noica, who became one of the most prominent Romanian philosophers, thought early on that Romanian philosophy is characterized by paganism, cosmicism (i.e. no acute separation of the world of the man from, transcendence) and determinism (or rather, "fatalism").

During the post-1965 communism period, the existence of a specific Romanian philosophy became an uncontested dogma. The official narratives, heavily influenced by national-communist and so-called protochronistic ideology, spoke even of the "philosophy of the Geto-Dacians". They were affirming a continuity of philosophical vision from Dacians, via folklore, to contemporary authors. Needless to say, the "materialistic" character of Romanian philosophy and other pretensions of the official dogma were inexistent or wildly exaggerated. However, some important non-Marxist authors, like Noica, also insisted on the singularity of Romanian philosophical thinking. Noica even wrote a book titled The Romanian Sentiment of Being.

After the communist regime fell in 1989, this discussion resurfaced. One opinion is that there are Romanian philosophers, but there is no Romanian philosophy. In other words, the phrase "Romanian philosophy" has a mere historical-geographical content. The opposite point of view consists in two theses: 
 Not all the European nations have their own national philosophy; 
 The Romanian nation has its own, distinctive, national philosophy, which continues at a higher level its traditional world-view. 
The article from the Routledge Encyclopaedia of Philosophy concerning the philosophy in Romania seems rather to adopt a weaker version of the second position. The existence of a Romanian philosophy is recognized, but is not connected to the national ethos, nor to the ethnic substance of the Romanians. Thus, the authors say: "At the peak of its evolution between the two world wars, Romanian philosophy had the following characteristic features: it was closely related to literature, in the sense that most Romanian philosophers were also important writers; it showed excessive preoccupation with the issue of Romanian identity; it was involved in Romania's historical, political and ideological debates, fueling attitudes in favour of or against Westernization and modernization; it synchronized quickly with Western philosophical thinking; and it was (and still is) lacking in ethical thought." (Marta Petreu, Mircea Flonta, Ioan Lucian Muntean, "Romania, philosophy in" from the Routledge Encyclopedia of Philosophy, 2004)

Historical outline

Beginnings 
 

The first broadly philosophical texts attested on the Romanian territory are the Patristic writings. Among this corpus of texts, in Church Slavonic translations, the most important are the works of Dionysius the Pseudo-Areopagite and the Dialectics of St. John Damascene . Excerpts from ancient philosophers circulated also. The only notable indigenous production of the epoch is The Teachings of Neagoe Basarab to his Son, Theodosius, written around 1521. The book is a compilation of patristic and biblical sources, with many moral and political reflections, from an ascetic viewpoint. It illustrates Byzantine theocracy and proposes the model of a prince-monk.

17th century 

In the middle of the 17th century, Romanian acquires the status of liturgical language alongside Greek and Slavonic, and begins to develop a philosophical vocabulary. Nicolae Milescu (1638–1708) authored the first translation of a philosophical text into Romanian (the treatise On the Dominant Reason of Pseudo-Josephus Flavius, translated towards 1688). Miron Costin (1633–1691) wrote the first philosophical poem in Romanian, "The Life of the World" (1672), an ethical reflection on the earthly happiness. The most important philosophical production of this century is The Divan (1698) of Dimitrie Cantemir (1673–1723), a philosophical treatise which supports the Orthodox ethics with rational arguments. This treatise was translated into Arabic for the use of the Syrian Christians, and, later, into Bulgarian.

Some philosophical texts were written in Latin. Gavril Ivul (1619–1678), a Jesuit who taught philosophy in the University of Vienna, wrote a logical treatise, Propositiones ex universa logica (1654). Cantemir authored a textbook of logic and a treatise of "theologo-physics", Sacrosanctae scientiae indepingibilis imago (1700) which, besides discussing the nature of time, and the problem of the universals, tries to justify Biblical cosmogony with non-theological arguments drawing on the philosophy of Jan Baptist van Helmont. He left also a text on the philosophy of history, Monarchiarum physica examinatio.

18th century 

In the 18th century, the dominant philosophy in Moldavia and Walachia is the neo-Aristotelianism of Theophilos Corydalleus, which was in fact the Paduan neo-Aristotelianism of Zabarella, Pomponazzi and Cremonini. Towards the last quarter of the century, this was challenged by the spread of rationalism (Christian Wolff) and empiricism (John Locke). Important figures may be considered Samuel Micu (1745–1806) in Transylvania, and Iosif Moisiodax (1730–1800) in Moldavia. The first translated intensively from the Wolffian Baumeister, implicitly promoting German enlightenment. The last contributed decisively at the modernization of the philosophical curriculum in the Princely Academies. He wrote an essay called The Apology, a splendid plea for modern European philosophy and against the old Aristotelian Chorydaleian scholasticism. The philosophical language of this century was mostly Greek. One notable exception is provided by the clucer Ioan Geanetu (Jean Zanetti), who published in 1787, in Greek and French, a treatise called Réfutation du traité d'Ocellus de la nature de l'univers. Here he criticised an ancient conception regarding the eternity of the universe, in order to reinforce the faith of his correligionaries.

19th century 
The 19th century can be divided from the point of view of a history of philosophy into three periods: that of the final days of the Phanariote regime, that of the restoration of the Romanian dynasties and, finally, that of Charles I, who came from a foreign dynasty (Hohenzollern).

The End of the Phanariote Regime 
In the first two decades of the 19th century the most prominent philosophers in the Romanian Principalities are still the Greek professors of the Princely Academies. Among them, we can mention Lambros Photiades, Konstantinos Vardalachos, Neophyte Doucas and Benjamin Lesvios in Bucharest, as well as Daniel Philippidis, Stephanos Doungas and Dimitrios Panayotou Govdelas in Iași. Some of them were alumni of the Academies from the Principalities, as Vardalachos, who studied with Photiades, himself an ancient student of the Princely Academy from Bucharest. Daniel Philippidis also studied at this Academy in the 1780s, under the famous philologist Neophyte Cavsocalyvitis. But they had studied also (with the exception of Photiades) in major Western universities. Doungas, for example, was a student of Friedrich Wilhelm Joseph Schelling. In his Physics he tried to reconcile the dogmatic Orthodox theology with the science of nature, following Schelling's system.

They were not only proponents of modern philosophy and natural sciences, but also of Enlightenment ideas. The philosophy of the French "philosophes" had thus a major impact on the Romanian intelligentsia through their courses and published books. Philosophically, the most interesting of these authors is Beniamin Lesvios, whose Metaphysics contains, among other valuable things, a theory of perception involving the discussion of the conceptual possibility of colour-inversion. Also, it is worth mentioning that Philippides is the first follower of Kant in the Romanian Principalities.

The Epoch of the Restored Autochthonous Dynasties 
After 1821, the ruling Princes will be once again elected by local noblemen i.e. the boyars (and validated by the Sultan). The Greek will be replaced in the Academies with the Romanian. It is an era of exalted patriotism and de-hellenization of Romanian culture and habits. Romanians begin to go directly to Western sources and to practice philosophy in their own language.

As early as 1818 the Transylvanian Gheorghe Lazăr (1779–1821), who studied in Vienna, began teaching philosophy in Romanian in the Greek-speaking Academy. We do not have any of his courses left, but we know that he was a follower of Kant. It is debatable whether he had first-hand knowledge of Kant or not. We know that for didactical purposes he decided to make a Romanian translation of some of Krug's works, which he subsequently used as a textbook. Krug's Handbook of Philosophy and Philosophical Literature will be translated in the first period of the 19th century another three times, by August Treboniu Laurian (1810–1881), Timotei Cipariu (1805–1887) and Simeon Barnutiu (1808–1864). They were all Transylvanian, and they all studied in Vienna. Cipariu was a teacher of philosophy in the Romanian College from Blaj, where he taught using Krug's works in the 1828's. As such, philosophical criticism was mainly a Transylvanian specialty.

An important philosopher of this period is Eufrosin Poteca (1786–1858). He studied in the Princely Academy from Bucharest with Vardalachos, Doukas and Lesvios and at the universities of Pisa and Paris (1820–1825). Eufrosin Poteca taught philosophy at the Saint Sava Academy, and was a prolific translator of philosophical and theological works. His own philosophy was strongly influenced by the Sensualism of Condillac, de Tracy and Soave, by Rousseau's political philosophy and by his strong Christian beliefs. He maintained that there are three metaphysical first principles, body, soul and spirit, studied by three distinct sciences: physics (the study of unanimated bodies), psychology (the study of animated things) and ideology (in the sense of de Tracy, the science of ideas). The whole universe displays this triadic structure, as it is permeated by matter, life and logos. He identified the laws of nature with the laws of God, and he drew from this conception many moral conclusions, e.g. the lack of foundation of celibacy. Also, he thought that the foundation of all morals, politics and rights is the golden rule. From here he argued against slavery, and that got him exiled to a remote monastery, where he lived until the end of his life.

Another important name is that of Ionică Tăutul (1798–1828), a Moldavian boyar. He was educated at home by some French refugees, acquiring an extensive knowledge of political philosophy. Indeed, he quotes Locke, Rousseau, Montesquieu, Voltaire, but also obscure writers such as Sabatier de Castre. His ideas are disseminated mostly in his correspondence and political pamphlets. But he left also some interesting works, like a Construction of Politics according to Human Nature or an Essay against Deists and Materialists. His intention was to build a political theory starting from a Christian anthropology of the state of nature. The political system to be justified by such a procedure was an "aristo-democratic republic". The second essay, whose title is obviously inspired by Mersenne, criticises the materialist vision of the man-machine (La Mettrie) on the basis of a rather Paulinic doctrine of the "amphibian" character of man, character which clearly distinguishes him from the natural world.

An important philosopher is also Alexandru Hâjdeu (1811–1872), a student of Friedrich Wilhelm Joseph Schelling in Berlin. This man, although very proud of his Moldavian origin, was an ardent Russian patriot, since he lived in Bessarabia, Moldavian territory annexed by Russia. His philosophy is concerned with the destiny of Russia, and he is a slavophile and a messianistic. He argues for the development of a purely Russian philosophy, emerging from the careful study of the Russian language. According to him, Only such a philosophy can be national, an only this way the Russian element can be brought to universality. The way to arrive at such a philosophy is to continue the thinking of Skovoroda, the only authentic Russian philosopher up to then. This will fulfil the moment of existence for itself of the Russian nation.

Ioan Zalomit (1820–1885) studied the philosophy in France and in Germany, at Berlin, with Victor Cousin and Friedrich Wilhelm Joseph Schelling. He obtained here the title of doctor of philosophy with a thesis on Kant (1848). In his inaugural dissertation, Zalomit tries to overcome the Kantian opposition between laws of nature and moral laws. He affirms that liberty is inherent to nature, so that the moral laws are in fact laws of nature. All the moral actions are thus the result of a "duty towards nature". It is only this way that a rational theodicy is possible.

Simeon Bărnuțiu (1808–1864) taught philosophy at the Blaj College, at the Mihaileana Academy and, finally, at the University of Iași. His remaining published courses are mostly adaptations after Krug, Beck, Rottek and Niemeyers. His most interesting contributions are to be found in the philosophy of right. A revolutionary, Bărnuțiu wanted to defend the right to self-determination of the Transylvanian Romanians. He found ideas suitable for his purpose in the philosophy of Krug, widely diffused in Transylvania by the Hungarian exponents of the "philosophy of harmony" – Samuel Köteles, János Hetény and Gusztáv Szontágh. Other influences came from Savigny. In his The Public Law of Romanians (1867) Bărnuțiu wanted to prove that Romanian law was in fact Roman law, which had been perpetuated throughout history. Further more, Roman law seemed to him to respect the natural rights of the individuals, as formulated in the Enlightenment theories of natural law.

At the end of this period, the most important and original thinker is Ion Heliade Rădulescu (1802–1872). Rădulescu studied at the Princely Academy from Bucharest, under Neophyte Doukas, and from 1818 migrated to the Romanian classes of Gheorghe Lazăr. After the death of Lazar he became a teacher in the Academy and he had a prodigious activity as a cultural animator. In 1828 he published an "almost philosophical" (in his words) Romanian Grammar, influenced by Condillac, which he knew from his Greek teachers. After the turmoil of the 1848 Revolution, Heliade Rădulescu comes up with a philosophical system, inspired from kabala and the socialism of Proudhon and Fourier. There are also traces of Hegel's influence, but not directly read (he knew him probably from the works of Cousin). His two most important works are The Universal Critical History and Equilibrium between Antitheses.

Heliade Rădulescu proposes, against monisms and dualisms of all kind, a trinitarian philosophy. He affirms that all philosophical concepts come in dualities, which can be classified in two categories: sympathetic (or parallel) and antipathetic. A sympathetic duality is formed by two "positive" terms, which indicate an existence: time / space; spirit / matter; right / duty etc. An antipathetic duality contains a positive and a negative term: life / death; movement / inertia; good / evil etc. Now, each sympathetic duality produces a third term, through which the dualism is overcome. Here are some examples: spirit / matter / universe; form / substance / body; progress / conservation / perfectibility; spiritual man / physical man / moral man. Beginning from here, Heliade Rădulescu develops a kind of cosmology, by means of naïve although ingenious geometrical considerations. He means thus to offer a metaphysical explanation of progress and then, armed with this metaphysics, to fight the liberalism. For his final purpose is to offer an argument in support of his political position, called "progressive conservatism". To those who reply that this is an inconsistent position, he answers that the duality progress / conservation is not antipathetic, but sympathetic, and that only a progressive conservatism is perfectible.

The Epoch of Charles I (Carol I) 
In 1860 and 1864 Prince Alexandru Ioan Cuza founds the Universities of Iași and Bucharest, and in 1866 Karl von Hohenzollern-Sigmaringen becomes, under the name Carol I, Domnitor of the Principality of Romania, which will later become the Kingdom of Romania. This event marks a new wave of westernization, as well as a reaction against the formerly prevalent cultural model, that of Enlightenment. Almost at the same time, in 1863, the "Junimnea" literary society is founded in Iași.

The last thirty years of the 19th century are culturally dominated by the Junimea society. The Romanian philosophy will have a new beginning and, for the first time, an international echo. The philosophers from Junimea were Titu Maiorescu (1840–1917), Vasile Conta (1846–1882), Alexandru Xenopol (1847–1920), Mihai Eminescu (1850–1889), Constantin Leonardescu (1844–1907), Ioan Pop Florantin (1843–1926).

Titu Maiorescu studied the philosophy in Berlin, and obtained his two doctorates from the University of Giessen, and later from the University of Paris. His first philosophical paper was Einiges Philosophische in gemeinfasslicher Form (1860), a work that was rather well received, written under the influence of Herbart and Feuerbach. In Romanian, his most important contribution was a Logic (1876), influenced by Herbart, who had numerous reprints and served as a textbook until the years 1930. He was a proponent of Kant's philosophy, and he was skeptical with respect to the possibility of an original, creative, Romanian philosophy.

Vasile Conta obtained his doctorate from the Université libre de Bruxelles and functioned as a Professor of Law at the University of Iași. His works, published in Romanian and French, included La théorie du fatalisme (1877) and La théorie de l'ondulation universelle (1895). Conta was influenced by three sources: the evolutionist philosophy of Herbert Spencer, the positivism of August Compte, and the German materialism of Büchner, Vogt, and Moleschott. In his first work he defends a version of determinism, called "fatalism", and proposes a materialist theory of knowledge (or rather, a materialist model of cognition). Cognition is accounted for in terms of material modifications of the brain. He thought that sensorial input is transmitted through the nervous fibres under the form of "shakings", or vibrations, which provoke the apparition of physiological changes in the brain, called "imprintings". In the second cited work, Conta proposes a materialist metaphysics, affirming the wave-like character of the universe; according to this conception, the evolution of the universe as a whole, and of each entity in this universe has a wave-like character. Conta wrote also books on the history of metaphysics, on the nature of metaphysics, on the "first principles that constitute the world". He dissociated from the positivists of his time by arguing for the importance of metaphysics and for the presence of an artistic element in the construction of the metaphysical systems.

Alexandru Xenopol, historian and philosopher, had two doctorates, one of them in philosophy, conferred from the University of Giessen. His philosophy emerged from his constant preoccupations with history. In his most famous work, La théorie de l'histoire, Xenopol presents a philosophy of science of the utmost importance and interest. He draws a distinction between facts of repetition, and facts of succession. The facts of repetition are studied by the natural sciences, and are characterised by natural laws. The facts of succession are studied by the sciences of the spirit, notably by history, and they are not subsumed to any law, but they form series. Xenopol was considered by Rickert one of his precursors. He also discussed the concept of causality, the notion of hypothesis and of the verification of hypothesis. His views on space and time oppose Kantian doctrines, and he argues explicitly against the German philosopher, who in his opinion had turned history into a mere fairy tale.

Mihai Eminescu, the Romanian national poet, studied philosophy at Viena and Berline. Apparently he was preparing a thesis on the philosophy of history, but he never got his PhD. He is the author of the first Romanian (partial) translation of the Critique of Pure Reason. Many of his poems and prose contain, in appropriate literary form, quite a few philosophical ideas, mainly influenced by Kant, Schopenhauer, and Buddhism, but he never wrote philosophical texts proper. On the other hand, his political philosophy, exposed in newspaper articles and editorials is quite distinctive. Eminescu is one of the most important and influential Romanian conservative political thinkers of the last decades of the 19th century.

Constantin Leonardescu studied at the Universities of Bucharest and Paris, and was a professor of philosophy in the University of Iași. Generally, he was influenced by the French eclecticism and he had a thoroughly "scientific" attitude in philosophy. Like many of his time, Leonardescu had a great interested in psychology, science which he tried to apply to diverse domains of philosophy, such as epistemology and aesthetics. His long list of published books includes Philosophy Face to the Progress of Positive Sciences (1876), Metaphysics, Religion and Science (1884), The Principles of Psychology (1892), The Inductive Morals or the Science of the Human Behaviour (1885) etc.

Ioan Pop Florantin, a doctor of philosophy of the University of Vienna, taught philosophy in several high-schools in Iași. He authored several books on logic, psychology, and general philosophy, as well as the first Romania treatise on aesthetics (1874). He advanced also a personal conception called "the universal consecutionism", a kind of materialistic process metaphysics. From this position he summoned "the true Einstein" to the "tribunal of logic" towards the end of his life.

Prince Grigore Sturdza (1821–1901) was a learned man, who had philosophical preoccupations. He published some philosophical works in French, among which Les lois fondamentales de l'Univers(1891) is the most important. The book's subject-matter is chiefly the astronomy, or the scientific cosmology, which eventually serves as a basis for metaphysical speculations.

Outside the borders of the Principality, later Kingdom, of Romania, we can notice the activity of Vasile Lucaciu (1852–1922), from Maramures, a northern part of Transylvania. Of Greek-catholic confession, he studied at Rome where he obtained his doctorate in theology and philosophy. He is the author of a Thomist philosophical system, Institutions of Philosophy, published between 1881 and 1884 in three volumes: Logic (1881), Metaphysics (1882), and Moral Philosophy (1884).

20th century 
During the 20th century, the history of Romanian philosophy can be divided in three periods: the pre-communist period, the communist period, and the post-communist period.

Monarchist period 
Two major "schools" of philosophy have produced, in the first half of the century, two peaks of Romanian philosophy: the school of Maiorescu, and the school of Nae Ionescu. Transylvanian philosophers can also be grouped together, mostly by reason of their non affiliation to the two other schools, but also on the reason of their belonging to the same spiritual family. Apart this three "schools" or orientations, there are many other authors, cultivating with predilection the philosophical essay. A special mention deserve the members of the Onicescu circle, aptly characterised as analytic philosophers.

The Maiorescians 
The "Maiorescians" are Constantin Rădulescu-Motru (1868–1957), P. P. Negulescu (1872–1951), Dumitru Draghicescu (1875–1945), Ion Petrovici (1882–1972), and Mircea Florian (1888–1960).

Constantin Rădulescu-Motru, the grandson of Eufrosin Poteca, called his philosophical system "Energetic Personalism", influenced by the Otswald's energetism and Stern's personalism. An expert in experimental psychology (he studied under Wundt, getting his doctorate with a dissertation on Kant), he followed the inductivist trend in metaphysics. The human personality was considered by him a superior form of energy, the final stage of the evolution of the universe. His metaphysics implies a political program as well as an ethics of labor. The purpose of the political life must be the transition from the "anarchic personalism" that governed the Romanian society to "energetic personalism".

P. P. Negulescu published a Philosophy of the Renaissance still readable and a capital study in the philosophy of culture, called The Genesis of the Forms of the Culture.

Dumitru Draghicescu obtained his licence in philosophy with a memoir on the Influence of Kant on Auguste Compte (1901) at the University of Bucharest, continuing his studies in Paris, where he did his doctorate with Durkheim. In his youth he was under the influence of Conta's materialist philosophy. Draghicescu had major contributions in social philosophy (he was also an important sociologist). One of Draghicescu's books, Vérité et révelation: vers une nouvelle idée de Dieu (2 volumes, 1934), was very well received by Charles Hartshorne, for the authentically new aspects of the concept of God which it put forth. Draghicescu considered that man is the being the limit of whose development is divinity, saying that all of God's attributes can be applied as such to man, considered in his potentiality and historical destiny.

Ion Petrovici wrote on logic and metaphysics. In logic he contributed to the logical theory of notions, mainly regarding the relations between the intension and the extension of a term; he contradicted the law of their inverse dependence. In metaphysics perhaps the most well known of his contributions is the lecture "The Idea of Nothingness" (1933), in which the nothingness was determined as a "transcendent substance", preceding existence and transcending it, but manifesting itself immanently in the existent things.

Mircea Florian, who studied in Germany with the Neokantian Rehmke, elaborated between the wars a philosophy of the "pure datum", trying to overcome the epistemology based on the subject-object dichotomy. His results are published in the volume Philosophical Reconstruction (1943).

The Ionescians 
The "Ionescians" grouped around their teacher and/or friend, Nae Ionescu (1890–1940). He earned his PhD in Germany, with a study on "logistic", i.e., in the terminology of the epoch, mathematical logic. He actually rejected mathematical logic, thinking it is reductive even in comparison to classical logic. His thinking on logic in general may be regarded as a form of intuitionism. He published only newspaper articles, where he held strongly conservative, reactionary views, and he quickly moved toward the extreme right. After his death, some of his students and associates (Noica, Amzăr, Eliade, Onicescu, Vulcănescu) published his various lectures on Logic, History of Logic, Epistemology (i.e. Theory of Knowledge) and on Metaphysics and The History of Metaphysics. His approach to the History of Philosophy is mostly typological, not chronological. Nae Ionescu's thought could be described overall as an existential philosophy of Christian authenticity, called "Trăirism" (from the verb "a trăi", to live), an autochthonous version of Existentialism influenced by vitalism and Orthodox theology. Many late commentators have accused him of "plagiarism", neglecting that he never wrote his lectures, not even lecture notes; Ionescu creatively improvised, and on many occasions one can recognise ideas initiated by Bergson, Scheler, Heidegger; his charisma was impressive, and students were completely captivated by the fact that he philosophised on the spot, in the course room, without preconceptions, giving interesting answers to issues they raised, and provoking a certain spiritual tension, with an impetus toward thinking on one's own. Because he was quite ironic, always disposed toward revising his thought and never wrote philosophy proper, his disciples compared him to Socrates.

The most important of his adherents were Mircea Vulcanescu (1904–1952), Mircea Eliade (1907–1986), Emil Cioran (1911–1995), Constantin Noica (1909–1987). Others like Petre Țuțea were also influenced by his personality, and philosophers like Alexandru Dragomir and Mihai Șora attended some of his courses.

Mircea Vulcanescu had an enormous erudition, being considered by many the chief of the "generation", but did not publish significant philosophical papers. He did, however, influence Romanian philosophy with his seminal essay The Romanian Dimension of Existence. In this work he analyses the conceptual paradigm that serves as a means of evaluation of diverse philosophical visions by Romanians. By analysing certain Romanian phrases, in what he calls a phenomenological manner, he claims to unravel the inherent worldview. For example, from an analysis of the linguistic particularities of negation in the Romanian language, he deduces the Romanian ethos, with traits like fatalism or indifference regarding death, an easygoing attitude toward life, the conception that there is no alternative but also nothing irremediable.

Mircea Eliade, the well-known scholar of the history of religions, published a few essays showing the influence of his teacher Ionescu, but through these early works he brought nothing essentially new in the landscape of the Romanian philosophy. He was, however, a very important person in the intellectual landscape of the 1930s, another possible "leader" of a new generation.

Emil Cioran, in his early books written in Romanian, proposed a philosophy of despair, shows a morbid obsession with death, all expressed in a deeply lyrical manner. He wrote mostly on nihilist themes of Nietzschean and Schopeanhaurean provenance, with some contemporary influences like Giovanni Papini and Nicolai Berdiaev.

Constantin Noica debuted with an essay called Mathesis, or Simple Joys. The short book glosses on the distinction between life and geometry. After this essay Noica will orientate himself towards the history of philosophy, writing on Kant, Leibniz, Descartes, Plato, Aristotle, Hume etc. His PhD thesis was called A Sketch for the History of How Something New May be Possible, where he tries to answer how the spirit is not "endlessly tautologous", analysing European philosophy from Plato to Hume.

The Transylvanians 
Transylvania produced between the Wars three remarkable thinkers: Lucian Blaga (1895–1961), D. D. Rosca (1895–1980), and Eugeniu Sperantia (1888–1972).

Lucian Blaga's philosophical system, called "ekstatic intellectualism" is a highly original construction, with roots in the philosophy of Kant, psychoanalysis, and Patristic philosophy. The system was projected in five monumental "trilogies", but only three were achieved and a fourth was partially elaborated. The trilogies are, in order: The Trilogy of Knowledge, The Trilogy of Culture, The Trilogy of Values, and The Cosmological Trilogy.

The metaphysical vision of Blaga centres around a mysterious metaphysical source or principle he called "The Great Anonymous", which creates the Universe indirectly, by mutilating the forms of existence that emanate from him, in order to avoid the possibility of the apparition of another Great Anonymous. The results of these acts of mutilation are infinitesimal fragments, structured in types, and called "divine differentials". The extant beings appear by the aggregation of these differentials. The speculative cosmology of Blaga also includes an entelechial interpretation of evolutionist biology.

His theory of knowledge asserts the existence of an "unconscious spirit" endowed with his own set of categories which double the Kantian categories of the conscious spirit. These categories of the unconscious prevent humans from completely revealing the mystery of existence, since all his knowledge must fit into this categorical framework. Thus, the Great Anonymous maintains an isolated "centrality of existence", because a complete knowledge would make the man godlike, but also infuses human activity with a creative tension. Blaga's metaphysical axiology also follows this conception. All categories encompass human powers of expression, and their dynamic influence is finally projected into values. In other words, what we can not overcome, we idolise. This "finalist self-deluding" repetitively ensures the creative destiny of mankind.

All human culture is according to Blaga the result of man's trying to reveal the mysteries of existence, it constitutes the man's being. Since man can not reveal completely the mysteries, because of the "transcendent censure" exerted by the unconscious categorial scheme, all his productions bear the mark of this dynamic framework. The totality of these categories at some point is called a "stylistic matrix", and they have the structure of a "cosmoid", that is of a small universe, i.e. a self-sufficient order. Thus, each culture is characterised by a style, in which different categories activate and wear off successively, until the complete exhaustion of the stylistic matrix. At that moment, the culture generated by the attempts of revelation within the respective stylistic matrix dies. This vision is inspired by, but significantly detached from the morphological theory of culture, as exposed by a Frobenius or a Spengler. Blaga discusses extensively, with many illustrations why all these theories missed the point.

D. D. Rosca, who would later be the coordinator and translator of the series of complete works of Hegel into Romanian, arrived at a philosophical synthesis presented in his book The Tragic Existence. It is a personal blend of existentialism, with roots in Kierkegaard, but influenced also by Hegel. His PhD thesis at the Sorbonne, The Influence of Hegel on Taine, as well as his translation in French of the Life of Jesus made him a known name in the French-speaking world.

Eugeniu Sperantia was a very prolific author. He began his list of publications with his PhD thesis, The Pragmatic Apriorism, a rethinking of Kant's Transcendental Analytic from a Pragmatist stand-point. He wrote subsequently on various subjects, like the biology from a Hegelian perspective, gaining a reputation especially in the field of the philosophy of right. He was a pioneer in the field of erotetic logic (the logic of interrogatives), which he called "problematology". A very interesting and most neglected work is his System of Metaphysics: Implicit in the Postulates of Any Possible Knowledge. We have here a theoretical innovation in metaphysics: Sperantia replaces the categorial theories of classical metaphysics with the analysis of the most general questions, analysis rendered possible by his problematology. Thus, the framework-theory of metaphysics becomes the logic of the interrogatives. Recently, his conception of metaphysics was compared to that of Collingwood.

Other philosophers 
From the multitude of philosophical authors unaffiliated to the previous three currents we can mention here (almost randomly) Vasile Bancilă (1897–1979), Ionel Gherea, Anton Dumitriu (1905–1992) and Stéphane Lupasco (1900–1988).

Vasile Bancilă wrote two important commentaries on Blaga and Radulescu-Motru, and gave a valuable reply to Blaga's Mioritic Space, also called "plai", opposing what Bancilă called The Space of Bărăgan. Blaga's book maintained that the unconscious category of space which operates in the Romanian stylistic matrix was "the space indefinitely wave-like", an alternation on ups and downs, as a sinusoid. The name "mioritical" comes from "miorița", diminutive of sheep, i.e. an Ewe, the famous title of a popular ballad that is widely considered as quite relevant of the Romanian worldview, written in a peculiar alternating style. These are highly metaphorical and playful descriptions of a specific ethos common to significant cultural regions loosely related to a geographical space. Blaga also contends one may live in a plain but reflect a "mioritic plai" ethos, and that a specific ethos may become dominant even while it remains "minor" (the term is not loaded with value in Blaga's philosophy) and this "style" may absorb others while also being influenced by them. Bancilă on the other hand tried to show that Romanian culture as a whole does not reflect only a single "abysmal" category of space, the "plai" structure pointed out by Blaga, and he subsequently tried to show the existence of a "Bărăgan space" (Bărăgan is the name of the greatest plain in Romania); a space not determined by the alternating relief of hills or mountains, but by the flat plain.

Ionel Gherea, son of the noted Marxist sociologist Constantin Dobrogeanu-Gherea, published a book called The I and the World: Essay in Anthropomorphic Cosmogony. This much too neglected work contains a still interesting discussion of the concept of personal identity. The author does an unusual amount of conceptual analysis, although in extremely general lines he is a phenomenologist of Husserlian orientation.

Anton Dumitriu, mathematician by initial formation, obtained a PhD in philosophy then became the assistant of P. P. Negulescu. He was among the first philosophers in Romania interested in the philosophy of science, subject he treated in The Philosophical bases of Science. He introduces in Romania the latest mathematical logic, mostly by his works The New Logic and The Polyvalent Logic, where he presents the Russell–Whitehead axiomatic system of Principia Mathematica, and C.I. Lewis' system of strict implication. Also, he researched intensively the problem of logical – semantic paradoxes, having the conviction that the solution to them was already available in the works of the Scholastic philosophers.

Stéphane Lupasco, renowned francophone philosopher of science, tried to lay the basis of a new epistemology, consonant with the then newly developed quantum mechanics. He advocated a logic of the included third, which conducted him to sustain the existence of third state, beyond matter and energy.

In the 1940s the mathematician Octav Onicescu conducted a seminar in philosophy of science at the University of Bucharest. Among the most important members of this group of scientific philosophy were fellow mathematicians Grigore Moisil and Dan Barbilian as well as other notorious scientists like Șerban Țițeica or Nicholas Georgescu-Roegen. They were engaged in foundational research, using mathematics as a formal instrument of conceptual analysis. Their results were published in the anthology The Problem of Determinism, or in some monographs as Onicescu's Principles of Scientific Knowledge, Georgescu-Roegen's The Statistical Method or P. Sergescu's Mathematical Thinking.

Communist period 
Within the first decade of totalitarianism, Romanian philosophical life was dominated by the persecution of all important interbellum philosophers. Lucretiu Patrascanu (1900–1954) was the author of a work, Currents and Tendencies in Romanian Philosophy, which will establish for decades the status of the Romanian philosophers. With mostly rudimentary means, over-simplifications, appealing to the "Marxist-Leninist" doctrine, Patrascanu polemicized with major philosophers as Blaga, Radulescu-Motru, Florian, Cioran and "exposed" them as idealists, irrationalists, mystics, bourgeois, imperialists and sometimes fascists. Among the local pseudo-Marxists a new star emerged quickly, Constantin I. Gulian (1914–2011), a member of the Romanian Academy since 1955 until his death. Gulian produced at the peak of his career several expositions of Hegelian philosophy, completely lacking any value. During these first decades, philosophy was taught in Universities by dentists or illiterate workers turned into professors virtually overnight: Following Stalin's death, hardcore communist dogma slowly lost some of its force.

After 1964, the date of the great amnesty of all political prisoners, philosophical life had a chance to come back into existence, partly catalysed by the professional reinsertion of the relatively few surviving philosophers, who were either imprisoned or marginalized. Thus, we can distinguish several "schools" of philosophers: the interbellum school, the Păltiniș school and the Epistemological School of Bucharest. Independent figures existed, of course, mostly as university professors.

The Interbellum School 
The name of "school" may be even more inappropriate in this case than it was before, when we spoke of Nae Ionescu's school or of that of Titu Maiorescu. The Interbellum school should be seen in the same manner we speak of "the old school". The most important philosophers formed in the interbellum period, that could practice again philosophy, and remained significantly creative are: Mircea Florian, Constantin Noica, Anton Dumitriu, Mihai Șora (b. 1916), Petre Țuțea (1902–1991), Alexandru Dragomir (1916–2002).

Mircea Florian wrote in the 1960s in solitude a system of philosophy presented in a two-volume treatise called Recessivity as the Structure of the World. Inspired by an analogy with genetic biology, Florian arrives at the conclusion that experience is characterised by an invariant, the relation of recessivity that holds between two concepts. This relation is neither a relation of opposition, like the contrariety, nor one of concordance, like the subordination. It is a special relation which exhibits features of both types of inter-notional relation acknowledged by logic. It is both a relation of subordination, and a relation of opposition. In a pair of concepts united by this relation, there is one which is hierarchically superior, called the "dominant" concept, and another which, although hierarchically inferior, is ontologically superior, called the "recessive" concept. Florian shows that every important concept of philosophy belongs to a pair which instantiates recessivity. He analysed several dozens of such pairs, writing for each term practically a micro-monograph.

Constantin Noica became during this time, after his release from prison, a continental metaphysician of European dimensions, arguably one of the greatest of the late 20th century. His first book published after detention was 27 Steps of the Real in which he unifies three categorial systems, those of Plato, Aristotle, and Kant. Under a Hegelian, but maybe also influenced by Nicolai Hartmann, he thought that reality, divided in three realms, inorganic, organic and spiritual, is characterised by three distinct sets of categories. At the peak of this categorial ladder he put a new category, which reflects the impact that physics had on his thought: the undulation, or the wave, which became thus the supreme category.

He later developed the theory initiated by Vulcănescu, and wrote several books which brought him overnight celebrity, especially in literary circles. Books as Creation and Beauty in Romanian Speech, or The Romanian Sentiment of Being, masterpieces of etymological speculation and philosophical hermeneutics, have obviously limited universal value, of interest only to those researching Romanian spirituality per se. In these books Noica arrived at the conclusion that the Romanian language possesses a word, a preposition, which mediates its unique access to the realm of being. It is the preposition întru, which expresses the processuality of the being or what he calls "the becoming in-towards (întru) Being". This idiomatic preposition, of Latin provenance (intro) stands for more than a spatial inclusion: it indicates a going on, a movement both toward something, and within that something i.e. a movement of participation.

His ontology (more correctly called metaphysics) is edified without the idiomatic peculiarities in two later works, and consists of The Becoming in-to the Being and Letters on the Logic of Hermes, but it was incipient since Six Maladies of the Contemporary Spirit. In these works Noica shows how the monolithic unity of being is broken, and being displays three instances; The being of first instance is arrived at phenomenologically. As such, the being of things appears as a functional model, the structure Individual – Determinations – General (I-D-G), which the things are striving to realise. But the model of the being is rarely found realised like that; most currently it is incomplete, only two of the three terms being present. Thus, there are six incomplete, unsaturated formations, called by Noica "ontological precariousness" or "maladies of being" (or "of the spirit", in Six maladies...). These maladies, schematically represented as I-G, G-I, I-D, D-I, D-G, and G-D, are what he calls the rule of the real. Then, the being of second instance is the "element", characterised as an individual-general, which is an entity that is not a particular, i.e. its conditions of identity do not make reference to a single spatio-temporal location. Something is an individual-general if it distributes itself without dividing. Like the Whiteheadian ingression, the "distribution without dividing" is a rethinking of the Platonic participation. A favourite exemplification of the nature of an element is for Noica the concept of biological species. The elements are characterised by different categories than the things, of a speculative nature, like unity-multiplicity-totality, reality-possibility-necessity. The being of the third instance, or the being qua being, is theorised in several pages of an incredible density, and in a language close to theology. Noica attempts to rethink here the problem of the one and the many, in a Parmenidean – Platonic style. He formulates as a criterion for being the same "distribution without dividing".

Methodologically, Noica can be considered, paradoxically, an anti-Hegelian Hegelian. He revises Hegelian dialectics, accused explicitly by Noica of being dominated by the "ethos of neutrality". In Hegelian logic, Noica contends, Hegel himself must intervene in order to give the concepts the necessary impetus for their movement. They do not have in themselves the power to move dialectically. Noica considers that dialectics is circular and tetradic. The scheme thesis – antithesis – synthesis is replaced by him with the rival scheme theme – anti-theme – thesis – theme (refound). The spirit, Noica says, begins not with a thesis, but with a thematic horizon in which it moves, and into which it digs repeatedly, going more and more toward the intimacy of this horizon. Several of Noica's peculiar paradoxical concepts, which allow him to articulate his views on dialectics, are difficult to comprehend, and require much sympathy from the reader: "the non-limiting limitation", "the opening closure" etc.

Noica's philosophy is also concerned with the problem of reason and the problem of the individual. He redefines reason as "the conscience of the becoming in-to being". The philosopher wanted to save the individual from "the tyranny of the general", to give to the individual an "ontological dignity". He was deeply disturbed by the image of the individual as a simple instance of something general, as a simple particular case of a general rule. But he also intended to maintain the reality of the general natures, not wanting to reduce them to mere collections or classes of individuals. Thus, he rejected both Platonic realism, and nominalism of all kinds. Instead of choosing between nominalism and realism, he proposes a third version, which insists on the solidarity existent between the individual and the general, linked by their determinations. His triangle I-D-G forms thus an irreducible unity, reminiscent of Peirce's triad.

Constantin Noica formed around him an unofficial school of philosophy, based at Păltiniș, a mountain location where he spent his last living years. Păltiniș became a place of pilgrimage for young Romanian intellectuals, who went there in search of a spiritual mentor. Noica became thus a kind of national institution with an influence unequalled by any other intellectual figure before or after him. He imposed to his disciples the intensive study of Greek and German, and he asked them to approach "cultures", not authors and certainly not isolated books. He had an effervescent activity of translation, initiating in collaboration with Petru Creția the integral edition of Plato in Romanian. He also translated from neo-Platonic Aristotelian commentators, Dexippus, Ammonius, Porphyry and others. He contributed to the translation of Kant's Critique of Judgement, and he translated from Chorydaleus, the Introduction to logic and the Commentary to Metaphysics. He himself wrote commentaries and interpretations of Plato, Aristotle, and Hegel, and encouraged the introduction of Heidegger's writings. He was by far the most brilliant philosopher of post-war Romania.

Anton Dumitriu continued after 1964 his initial preoccupations, publishing in the philosophy of mathematics and in the theory and history of logic. His monumental History of Logic, although a landmark of Romanian philosophy and of the discipline, suffered from notable shortcomings and had a rather bad reception in the West. Dumitriu included too much on some topics of his history, with chapters on the transcendental and dialectical logic, and too little on others, not treating many branches of recent logic, or treating them completely sketchily and insufficiently, as in the case of modal logic. Also, he was misinformed on issues concerning Scholastic philosophy. However, there are many parts of this work that are still valuable today.

Anton Dumitriu wrote also a series of essays, more literary in style, which made him appreciated by the Romanian intellectual milieu, centered on literature. His book Philosophia Mirabilis is an essay on the esoteric dimension of the Greek philosophy,  Eleatic Cultures and Heracleitean Cultures, a comparative essay in the philosophy of culture, and Aletheia, a study of the Greek meaning of truth and of philosophy, where he criticises Heidegger's position in Introduction to Metaphysics.

Mihai Șora was a student of Nae Ionescu and Mircea Eliade, but younger than the members of the so-called '27 generation. He obtained in 1938 a bourse at the Sorbonne, where he went for preparing a thesis on Pascal. During wartime he wrote a book called On the Interior Dialogue, published only in 1947 at Gallimard, and well received by Jacques Maritain and Étienne Gilson. In this work Șora explores the problem of human authenticity, in an existential tone, but influenced greatly by Scholastic philosophy (notably that of Thomas Aquinas and Nicolaus Cusanus) and by Marxism (he was a member of the French communist party and a member of the Résistance).

In 1948 he returned to Romania, and couldn't leave the country anymore. He did not publish anything until the end of the 70s, when he began a cycle of four books, containing a philosophical system, achieved only in 2005. During the communist regime he wrote and published three of the four books composing the cycle: The Salt of the Earth, To be, the do, to have and I & You & He & She or the Generalised Dialogue. His last book is called The Instant and the Time. His system consists of an ontology, a poetics, an ethics and a political philosophy, all deriving from an original "ontological model". The influences comes from Péguy, Pascal, the Scholastics and from Husserl. Șora considered himself ever since his first book as "Cartesian of the utmost consequence", i.e. a phenomenologist.

His concept of intentionality, crucial for the comprehension of his philosophy, was neither that of Brentano, nor that of Husserl, but an original one with deep roots in the Scholastic philosophy. In-tentio, derived from IN aliud TENDERE is the penetrating act of the spirit, which goes beyond the things into their origin, which is the Unum with his three transcendentals: Bonum, Verum and Pulchrum. Thus, there are three forms of intentionality, moral, theoretical and esthetical, characterising three types of human attitudes toward the world. The Unum is not viewed only as an actus purus, but rather as a "universal potentiality of being". As such, i.e. is placed, in Șora's metaphorical model, at the centre of a sphere of null radius, which has, thus, the same topos as the periphery. The surface of this sphere represents the pure exteriority, composed of "terminal actualities". The radius is the geometrical locus of the interiority, where we find the "intermediary potentialities".

Mihai Șora is considered the mentor of another "school", much more discrete and heterogeneous than the school of Noica, and there is currently an increasing interest in his work, especially from the young philosophers grouped around the Studia Phaenomonelogica philosophical review.

Petre Țuțea had a PhD in Administrative Law. Before and during the Second World War he worked as a director in the Ministry of National Economy, and was known and appreciated by all members of the '27 generation as one of their own, even though he was a little older. He widely gained the reputation of a rhetorical genius, when he spoke everybody stood and listened. Some even considered him "a leader of his generation". Initially having youthful Marxist convictions, he developed right-wing nationalist sympathies, that would later lead to his arrest and conviction. In prison he rediscovered Christianity, and after his release he considered himself a Christian philosopher. Although due to his political antecedents and uncompromising content of philosophical ideas and religious faith Țuțea could not publish very much, he wrote a considerable amount, including a late work projected in five volumes, "Problems, Systems, Styles, Sciences" and finally "Dogmas". He completed the first two, and a small part of "Styles" and "Dogmas" – of which the first two volumes were published posthumously. "The Philosophy of Nuances" is also an important essay, a veritable manifesto for a new philosophy, dating back to 1969. Țuțea was influenced by a whole plethora of intellectual personalities, but mostly by Plato, Greek Skepticism, Leibniz, Nietzsche, Bergson, Simmel and the fictionalism of Hans Vaihinger. The only significant Romanian philosophical influences were Lucian Blaga and Nae Ionescu. Theologically, he was under the sway of St. Paul, Augustine and later Thomas Aquinas, while he also knew and admired the major contemporary Romanian theologian, Fr. Dumitru Stăniloae, whom he met in prison. Țuțea also appreciated various thinkers like Werner Sombart, and frequently refers to scientists like Heisenberg and Poincaré.

Initially Țuțea rejected the categories of Western idealism, replacing the Kantian conceptual framework with a spectrum of empirical-phenomenological nuances. His later philosophy, as he declares, is an effort of "theologal" (not theological) thinking. He argues that Truth is unique, but human reason cannot find it by itself, although it can be a receptacle of truth. Thus, in order to really know the truth, man needs inspiration and revelation. Man is never autonomous, and all intellectual efforts like science or philosophy are only means of producing fictions, at the level of material and cultural comfort. Țuțea believed that science and philosophy by themselves don't even have a consoling function, being essentially irrelevant with respect to the most dramatic issues, like death. Thus, only religion (specifically, Christianity) possesses the truth and bears relevance to the destiny of humankind. Without it, he says, man is just "a rational animal that comes from nowhere and doesn't go anywhere". Anthropologically, Țuțea analyzed what he calls "Christian man"; the anthropological model to be pursued is that of the saint.

Țuțea was undoubtedly an unusual, Socratic figure, in the sense of a major, exemplary personality, and his writing style is quite peculiar. His various writings are hardly classifiable, and even though he never finished whatever he started, after his release from prison Țuțea elaborated at least three original literary-philosophical styles: The Philosophy of Nuances, Theatre as Seminar and Religious-theologal Reflections. One of Țuțea's singular features, the so-called "substantivization" of predicates, related to his manner of writing sentences without verbs, as well as the many resonant repetitions he calls "leit-motifs" and constant nuancing of terms, coupled with a rejection of systems and the absence of philosophical speculation stuns most critics, who have no idea what to make of this unusual manner of thinking and writing, in a cultural environment mostly dominated by belletristic writing or academic exegesis. The Romanian public came to know his personality only after 1989, when several interviews of Țuțea, who was 89 years old were broadcast on TV and gained the admiration of a broad audience.

The subsequent publication of a collection of aphorisms gathered from interviews became a best seller, while his major writings are still not very well known or appreciated, although Țuțea was always surrounded by friends who typed and multiplied his manuscripts. Neighbours usually called him "Professor", because he always seemed to lecture, but as he ironically pointed out, his legendary tenured "chair" was under the blue sky, in the campus of Cișmigiu – a central park in Bucharest, very close to his studio apartment. Several of his close friends and companions such as Mircea Eliade, Emil Cioran, Petre Pandrea, later Marcel Petrișor, Aurel-Dragoș Munteanu and from the younger generation Radu Preda and Alexandru Popescu are also accomplished philosophers, writers and scholars.

Alexandru Dragomir is a late discovery of the Romanian public, actively promoted by the Humanitas Publishing House (led by Gabriel Liiceanu), which edited some of his notebooks. Dragomir, a former doctoral student of Heidegger, was a reticent man who wrote secretly and never intended to publish anything. In his old days he began giving private seminaries, which he carried on until his death; only a very narrow group of intellectuals attended. After he died several loosely thematic notebooks were found, proving that Dragomir was a phenomenologist of great class. Among these manuscripts, whose publication is not finished, there are several with reflections on time, which form the most consistent part of his thought. The influence of Dragomir on Romanian philosophy is still developing. Studia Phaenomenologica dedicated one of its issues to him.

The School of Paltinis 
Constantin Noica was in a continuous search for the gifted young philosophers, which he discovered and trained. Among these (at that time) young men, there are several which have manifested themselves in the philosophical and literary, or rather literary-philosophical Romanian environment. Such are Gabriel Liiceanu (b. 1942), Andrei Pleșu (b. 1948), Sorin Vieru (b. 1933), Andrei Cornea (b. 1952), Vasile Dem. Zamfirescu, Alexandru Surdu (b. 1938) and Corneliu Mircea.

Gabriel Liiceanu grew to prominence after he published The Păltiniș Diary, where he described his paideic adventure under Noica's guidance. It was also the book that transformed Noica into a sort of philosophical star. The Diary is perhaps the most influent Romanian philosophical publication of the late 1980s, initiating a fascination of younger generations with Păltiniș, and encouraging the study ancient Greek, Latin and German as prerequisites for the serious study of philosophy. Liiceanu's own philosophical project initially centered around the idea of "limit", and he therefore called his hermeneutic inquiry into the nature and history of this concept "peratology" (from the Greek peras = limit). This program initiated with The Tragic. A Phenomenology of Limit and Overcoming, his PhD thesis, where he lays much accent on Nietzsche, and accomplished with On Limit, the final and more general expression of his peratology. On Limit touches on various topics such as of liberty, destiny, responsibility, encounter with the other, in a framework basically Heideggerian. Liiceanu also accomplished the translation of Heidegger into Romanian.

Andrei Pleșu was first known as an art historian, but also as a subtle philosopher. He avows being more interested in the "light" side of philosophy, as he had a "respectful antipathy" towards Aristotle, and considered that he had absolutely no use for Hegel. He oriented himself toward ethics and the philosophy of religion. His focal idea is that of the "interval", the in-between of existence, as a space of itinerancy. Plesu wrote one of the very few Romanian treatises of ethics, Minima Moralia, which is subtitled "an ethics of the interval". It begins by affirming that only the man in the condition of itinerancy has moral competence, needing to make choices at every step of the way. Thus, true ethics is not a major one of the great problems and puzzles, but a minor ethics of the quotidian life and of ordinary situations. Further on, he explored the theme of the interval in his On Angels, a book of angelology, arising at the intersection between metaphysics and the philosophy of religion. In this book, the entities called angels are analysed as a cases of "beings of the interval". The entire exercise has thus the secondary value of ontology of the interval.

Sorin Vieru is one of the few Păltiniș logicians. He established his reputation by his researches on the classical syllogistic, which he axiomatised. He was also a specialist in Frege, from whom he translated abundantly. His interests covered also Greek philosophy, mostly Plato's political philosophy. He translated several of Plato's most difficult dialogues. Finally, he published an essay on The Risk of Thinking, in collaboration with the mathematician Uther Morgenstern, alias Terente Robert.

Andrei Cornea is a specialist in the ancient Greek philosophy and also a political thinker. During the communist regime he published little in the domain of philosophy, but he translated Plato's Republic. After 1989 he published intensively. Thus, we can cite his interpretation to Plato from Plato. Philosophy and Censorship, his interesting rehabilitation of the points of view sophistically rejected by Plato's Socrates from When Socrates is not Right, or his proposing of replacing the concept of utopia with that of ek-topia, as opposed to en-topia, in From the School of Athens to the School of Paltinis. But perhaps his most important contribution is the valuable critique of contemporary relativism from The Khazar Tournament. He translated Aristotle's Metaphysics and a great part of Plotinus's Enneads.

Vasile Dem. Zamfirescu's main interests are in psychoanalysis. Therefore, his philosophy bears the marks of these interests. He wrote a book on The Logic of the Heart and the Logic of the Mind, well liked by Noica, and after 1989 he published his Philosophy of the Unconscious (2 volumes), exploring the philosophical potential of the psychoanalytical idea of unconscious.

Alexandru Surdu was one of the earliest collaborators on Noica, but in a great measure independent. He specialised initially in logic, publishing books on Intuitionism and Intuitionist logic. He also studied the Aristotelian logic, thus arriving to his The Theory of Pre-judicative Forms, a rethinking of the categories with the means of formal logic. After 1989 he published on the Romanian philosophy and speculative philosophy. Notable volumes are The Pentamorphosis of the Art and The Speculative Philosophy. Alexandru Surdu is, like Noica, an anti-Hegelian Hegelian. Thus, he criticises Hegel for his "absolutisation" of triadic dialectics, he criticises also Noica for absolutising the tetradic dialectics, while proposing his version of a pentadic dialectics. He maintains, though, that diverse experiential realms are to be investigated by diverse dialectics, binary, triadic, tetradic or pentadic. His philosophy continues the long-time discredited epistemology of the faculties, which he complicates by speaking of five faculties of thinking. Thus, we have: intellect, rational intellect, reason, speculative reason, and speculation. The categories of the systematic philosophy, as determined by Surdu, are also five: Transcendence/Subsistence, Being, Existence, Real Existence, and Reality. Surdu was one of the translators of Wittgenstein's Tractatus into Romanian and he translated also from Kant.

Corneliu Mircea is a psychiatrist and also a philosopher, encouraged by Noica, but not actually one of his disciples. Still, his interests, themes, and style, places him in the Păltiniș circle, where he paid visits regularly. He published quite consistently. During communism he gave, among other publications, The Book of Being, Being and Consciousness, Discourse on Being, and after 1989 he published (among other things) The Originary, Being and Ek-stasis, The Making. A Treatise on Being. Influenced by Hegel and by Sartre, his philosophy is an inquiry into the meaning of being, commencing with nothingness, in an attempt of rethinking both Hegel's Logic and Sartre's Being and Nothingness. He cultivates a deliberate literary expression, maintaining that the philosophical discourse must have two sides, one conceptually objective, the other subjective, aesthetic, persuasive. Lately, Corneliu Mircea seems close to some form of mystical philosophy.

The Epistemological School of Bucharest 
Following the examples of Anton Dumitriu, Grigore Moisil or Octav Onicescu, several teachers at the University of Bucharest oriented themselves toward epistemology and the philosophy of science, which due to its technical nature lacked ideological control and interference. After the demise of the communism, they continued their preoccupations, but also wrote on many other subjects. The protagonists of this school were Mircea Flonta (b. 1932), Ilie Parvu (b. 1941), Vasile Tonoiu (b. 1941), and Marin Turlea (b. 1940).

Mircea Flonta wrote a valuable monograph on the theme of the analytic/synthetic distinction in contemporary philosophy, and a study on the Philosophical Presuppositions of the Exact Sciences. He can be considered the first analytical philosopher in Romania, understanding philosophy as a critical study of presuppositions. His activity continued after 1989 and diversified, as he approached such themes as the perception of philosophy in the Romanian culture. Among his perennial interests are the philosophy of Kant (he translated from Kant and wrote a book on him) and that of Wittgenstein (likewise, he translated several of his books and published a book on his philosophy).

Ilie Parvu is an epistemologist, philosopher of science, metaphysician and interpreter of Kant. His Introduction to Epistemology was the first book of this kind who had a European level, after the period in which the only epistemology was the Marxist–Leninist "gnoseology". It is still the best autochthon introduction available. His studies in the philosophy of science (The Scientific Theory, The Semantics and the Logic of Science) laid accent mostly on the contemporary formal instruments of analysis of the scientific theories. Parvu can be considered as belonging to the structuralist current in the philosophy of science, following J. Sneed, W. Stegmüller, C. U. Moulines, W. Balzer etc.

The structuralist analysis of theories was applied by Ilie Parvu in the domain of the reconstruction of some crucial philosophical works, like the Tractatus of Wittgenstein or the Critique of Pure Reason.

As a metaphysician, Parvu published the two-volume The Architecture of Existence. In the first volume he analyses the structural-generative paradigm in ontology. He conceives of an ontological theory as having an abstract-structural core, which generates its applications not by direct instantiation, but by restrictions and specialisations of this core, which evolves at the same time with the application. Professor Parvu analysed also the theories capable of furnishing decisive mediations between the structural abstraction of the nucleus and the world of empirical evidence. In the second volume he analysed the contemporary analytic metaphysics, the great ontological contemporary constructive programs, as that of Carnap or Quine, as well as diverse local metaphysics, like that of dispositions, powers, the ontologies of events, and different theories of the individual. He presented also important discussions concerning the metaontology, constructional apparatus, style and techniques in recent metaphysics.

Vasile Tonoiu was interested mostly in continental philosophy of science, translating Poincaré, Gonseth, Bachelard, and writing monographs on Gonseth and Bachelard. He also published a book on Morin's epistemological vision of complexity. Another chief interest of Tonoiu's is the dialogic philosophy, or the philosophy of dialogue. He wrote also an excellent book on Mircea Eliade, Archaic Ontologies in Actuality.

Marin Turlea dedicated his career to the philosophy of mathematics. His work on The Philosophy and the Foundations of Mathematics traces a distinction between the foundational and the foundationist research in mathematics, i.e. between mathematicians' own research on its foundations, and the philosophical research of the foundations of the mathematics. In this book he soundly establishes the possibilities, sphere of action and relevance of the philosophical study of mathematics. Following the lines of the program indicated in this first work, Turlea will elaborate a Philosophy of Mathematics, more like a history of the philosophical problems connected with systems of mathematics, from Plato and Proclus to Principia Mathematica. He analyzes the metaphysics of mathematical entities in his Existence and Truth in Mathematics, and he studies Wittgenstein's philosophy (or rather anti-philosophy) of mathematics.

The Marxism 
In Romania Marxism did not produce any notable philosophers. The only Marxist philosopher of any importance born in Romania, Lucien Goldman, flourished in France. Within the mass of ideologists with philosophical pretensions, several figures detach though as honest philosophers.

This is the case of Athanase Joja (1904–1972), logician and interpreter of the ancient philosophy, with contributions to Marxist "dialectical logic". He founded the Romanian Academy's Institute of Logic, where many interbellic philosophers, including Noica, were reinserted professionally.

Another Marxist figure was Henri Wald (1920–2002), whose thinking was a mixture of French Structuralism and Marxism, and who wrote also an Introduction to the Dialectical Logic.

Ion Ianoși (b. 1928) is a Marxist philosopher from a different class, closer to literature, being for many years the secretary of the literary critique section of the Union of the Writers from Romania. He published a trilogy on the aesthetical category of the sublime, a volume on Hegel and the Art and many others, among which a study of the Romanian philosophy in its relation with literature, Philosophy and Literature.

Democratic period 
After the Revolution from 1989, the philosophy in Romania began rapidly to synchronize with the Western contemporary philosophy.

Thus, phenomenology is represented especially by two groups, one from Cluj, with Virgil Ciomoș and Ion Copoeru as main characters, the other from Bucharest, developed as a consequence of Liiceanu's influence. This later group includes the editors of Studia Phaenomenologica, Cristian Ciocan and Gabriel Cercel, and the Heideggerians like Catalin Cioaba or Bogdan Minca. Virgil Ciomoș published phenomenological interpretations of Aristotle and Kant, while Copoeru is a Husserlian scholar.

Post-modernism in Romanian philosophy has as recent notable exponents such as Ciprian Mihali and Bogdan Ghiu. Although Mihali is more interested in the phenomenological analysis of the quotidian, his thinking is deeply rooted in French post-Structuralism. Ghiu, through his translations on Deleuze and various essays spread the influence of postmodern and poststructuralist French philosophy in Romania, although it remains rather subdued, without any mature philosophers.

Analytic philosophy has developed mostly at the University of Bucharest, by such names as Mircea Dumitru, Adrian-Paul Iliescu, Adrian Miroiu, Valentin Mureșan, Mihail-Radu Solcan. Mircea Dumitru wrote on philosophical logic, the philosophy of language and the philosophy of mind. Iliescu is a political philosopher (liberalism and conservatism), but also has interests in the philosophy of language, publishing a book on Wittgenstein. Adrian Miroiu published works in the fields of modal logic, philosophy of science and political philosophy. More recently, after joining the National School of Political Science and Public Administration, he has moved to other fields which are intimately related to political science, such as social choice theory, rational choice theory, electoral competition, public policies and educational policies. Valentin Muresan works in the field of ethics, cultivating the philosophical commentary. He published commentaries of Plato, Aristotle, and Mill. Professor Solcan contributed to the development of the philosophy of mind in Romania, publishing an introduction to the philosophy of mind form the perspective of the cognitive sciences.

A philosopher intellectually affiliated to the interbellic tradition, very close to the members of the Păltiniș school, who also attended some of Dragomir's seminars is Horia-Roman Patapievici. He was saluted by Liiceanu as a "Romanian Kierkegaard" for his first published essays, but later had to bear the unfair weight of this exaggerated remark. His most ambitious book to date is on The Recent Man, or What is lost when Something is won. In this essay of cultural and political philosophy Patapievici develops a conservative critique of late modernity, of vast scope and unequal pertinence, making him however the most notable contemporary Romanian liberal-conservative thinker. More recently his thinking seems to have adopted some libertarian influences.

Professor Ștefan Aloroaei from the University of Iași is a specialist in hermeneutics. The books that made his reputation are The Negative Reason. Historico-symbolic Scenarios and How is Philosophy in Eastern Europe Possible?. He published also Our Metaphysics of All Days, where he tries to hermeneutically investigate the metaphysica naturalis implicit in the ordinary intercourse of the commonsense with the world.

Finally, many university philosophers, mostly exponents of a continental style, continue the interbellic tradition of the Jack-of-all-trades philosophers, producing mostly works of history of the philosophy and of philosophical hermeneutics.

Bibliography
 Bagdasar, Nicolae – Istoria filosofiei românești, București: Societatea Română de Filosofie, 1940
 Ianoși, Ion – O istorie a filosofiei românești în raport cu literatura, Cluj: Apostrof, 1997
 Marta Petreu, Mircea Flonta, Ioan Lucian Muntean, "Romania, philosophy in", Routledge Encyclopedia of Philosophy, 2004
 Parvu, Ilie – " Traditii ale filosofiei analitice din Romania ", in Revista de Filosofie Analitică Volumul I, 1o, Iulie-Decembrie 2007, pp. 1–17

References

External links

 
History of Eastern Romance people